Dmytro Bondar may refer to

 Dmytro Bondar (futsal player), Ukrainian futsal player
 Dmytro Bondar (footballer), Ukrainian footballer